Mohsen El-Sayed (born 25 June 1955) is an Egyptian sports shooter. He competed in the mixed trap event at the 1984 Summer Olympics.

References

1955 births
Living people
Egyptian male sport shooters
Olympic shooters of Egypt
Shooters at the 1984 Summer Olympics
Place of birth missing (living people)